Prince Konstanty Adam Czartoryski (October 28, 1777 – April 24, 1866) was a Polish nobleman who became colonel in 1809 in the Duchy of Warsaw and brigadier general in 1815 in Congress Poland.

External links
Constantin von Wurzbach: Czartoryski, Constantin Fürst. In: Biographisches Lexikon des Kaiserthums Oesterreich. 

1774 births
1860 deaths
Polish generals
Konstanky Adam
Polish people of German descent
Polish commanders of the Napoleonic Wars